The 46th Infantry Regiment "Reggio" is an inactive unit of the Italian Army last based in Sassari in Sardinia. Founded in 1859 the regiment is part of the Italian army's infantry arm and named for the city of Reggio Emilia.

History 
The regiment was raised on 8 August 1859 as 4th Infantry Regiment of the Army of the United Provinces of Central Italy. On the same date the 3rd and 4th infantry regiments formed the Brigade "Reggio", which on 25 March 1860 entered the Royal Sardinian Army three days after the Kingdom of Sardinia had annexed the United Provinces of Central Italy. Already before entering the Royal Sardinian Army the brigade's two infantry regiments had been renumbered on 30 December 1859 as 45th Infantry Regiment and 46th Infantry Regiment to establish their order of precedence in the Royal Sardinian Army. Together with its sister regiment the 46th Infantry Regiment participated in the Second and Third Italian War of Independence.

World War I 
The Brigade "Reggio" fought on the Italian front in World War I, for which its two regiments were each a awarded a Bronze Medal of Military Valour. On 31 October 1926 the Brigade "Reggio" assumed the name XXX Infantry Brigade and became the infantry component of the 30th Territorial Division of Cagliari, which was based on the island of Sardinia. In 1934 the division was renamed 30th Infantry Division "Sabauda".

World War II 

The division and its regiments spent World War II initially in Sardinia and until the were transferred to Sicily after the Armistice of Cassibile, where they were engaged primarily in airfield defence, policing and demining work. On 15 August 1946 the Internal Security Division "Sabauda" was downsized to brigade and, due to the result of the 1946 Italian institutional referendum, which had resulted in the deposition of the Royal House of Savoy, the brigade was named Infantry Brigade "Reggio". The Reggio was dissolved with most of its units on 1 Februar 1948, while the 45th Infantry Regiment "Reggio" based in Catania and the 46th Infantry Regiment "Reggio" based in Palermo joined the Infantry Division "Aosta".

Cold War 
On 31 January 1959 the 46th Infantry Regiment "Reggio" left the Infantry Division "Aosta" and became a recruits training unit in Palermo under the Sicily Military Region. With the 1975 army reform the Italian Army abolished the regimental level and battalions came under direct command of the brigades and regional commands. Therefore, on 1 October 1975, the 46th Infantry Regiment "Reggio" (Recruits Training) was disbanded and the regiment's I Battalion in Palermo was reformed as 46th Infantry Battalion "Reggio" (Recruits Training). The battalion was given the flag and traditions of the 46th Infantry Regiment "Reggio" and assigned to the Motorized Brigade "Aosta".

On 14 February October 1978 the 46th Infantry Battalion "Reggio" was disbanded and its flag transferred to the Shrine of the Flags in the Vittoriano in Rome.

References

Infantry Regiments of Italy